The 2022 Rugby Football League Women's Super League South (known as the Betfred Women's Super League South due to sponsorship) was the second season of the Women's Super League South rugby league competition composed of teams from the south of England and Wales.

Teams
Army Rugby League
Bedford Tigers
Bristol Golden Ferns
Cardiff Demons
London Broncos
Oxford Cavaliers

Oxford Cavaliers made the competition debut, replacing Cornish Rebels.

Table

Source:

Finals series

References

External links
Women and girls rugby league

RFL Women's Super League
RFL Women's Super League
RFL Women's Super League
RFL Women's Super League